Kevin Bradley Krook (born April 5, 1958) is a Canadian former professional ice hockey defenceman.  He played three games in the National Hockey League with the Colorado Rockies in the 1978–79 season.

Regular season and playoffs

External links

1958 births
Living people
Calgary Centennials players
Canadian expatriate ice hockey players in the United States
Canadian ice hockey defencemen
Colorado Rockies (NHL) draft picks
Colorado Rockies (NHL) players
Ice hockey people from Alberta
Muskegon Mohawks players
New Westminster Bruins players
People from Cold Lake, Alberta
Regina Pats players